Aequatorium asterotrichum is a species of flowering plant in the family Asteraceae. It is endemic to Ecuador, where it grows in high Andean forest habitat.

References

asterotrichum
Endemic flora of Ecuador
Endangered plants
Taxonomy articles created by Polbot
Plants described in 1978